Auburn School may refer to:

 Auburn High School (disambiguation)
 Auburn Middle School (disambiguation)
 Auburn City Schools, a school district in Auburn, Alabama
 Auburn School Department, a school district in Auburn, Maine
 Auburn School District, a school district in King County, Washington
 Auburn Union Elementary School District, a school district in Placer County, California
 Auburn Enlarged City School District, a school district in Auburn, New York

See also
 Auburn (disambiguation)